Arthur C. Lawrence is former American football, baseball and ice hockey coach. He served as the head football coach at Union College in Schenectady, New York from 1941 to 1942, compiling a record of 5–9–2. Lawrence was also the school's head hockey coach (1935–1936, 1940–1942, 1947–1948) and head baseball coach (1939–1942, 1946–1975).

References

Year of birth missing
Year of death missing
American football centers
Purdue Boilermakers football players
Union Dutchmen baseball coaches
Union Dutchmen football coaches
Union Dutchmen ice hockey coaches